Borland’s Trustee v Steel Brothers & Co Ltd [1901] 1 Ch 279 is a UK company law case, concerning the enforceability of a company's constitution and the nature of a company share. It is also one of the rare exceptions to the rule that a transfer of assets which only takes effect upon a person's bankruptcy is normally void.

Facts 
Steel Bros Ltd’s articles of association said if a member went bankrupt his shares would be transferred to designated persons at a fair price not above par value. Mr JE Borland held 73 £100 shares and went bankrupt, and so the company gave Borland’s trustee in bankruptcy notice of the transfer. The trustee argued the article was void because it compromised ownership and property rights which tended to perpetuity, against the rule against perpetuities. It requested an injunction against the share transfer at all, or at anything less than a fair value

Judgment 
Farwell J rejected Borland Trustee’s argument and held the article was valid. The transfer could be made, because the contract engendered in the articles of association are prior to the rights contained in a share. He said the argument that the article was repugnant to absolute ownership needed to assert, wrongly, that a share is a sum of money dealt with by executory limitations. But in fact a share is an interest and consists of ‘a series of mutual covenants entered into by all the shareholders inter se in accordance with section 16 of the Companies Act 1862.’ The argument about perpetuity has no application because the rule against perpetuities does not apply to personal contracts.

Cambridge Gas 
The case was cited with approval in the decision of the Privy Council in the leading case of Cambridge Gas Transport Corp v Official Committee of Unsecured Creditors (of Navigator Holdings Plc and Others) [2006] UKPC 26, [2007] 1 AC 508.

See also 

UK company law
Capacity in English law
Agency in English law
Navigator Gas LLC

Notes

References 
WN Hohfeld, 'Some fundamental legal conceptions as applied in judicial reasoning' (1913) 23 Yale Law Journal 16

External links 
 LLB Lecture Notes – what is a share?

United Kingdom company case law
High Court of Justice cases
1901 in case law
1901 in British law